Cominella quoyana is a species of predatory sea snail, a marine gastropod mollusc in the family Cominellidae.

Subspecies 

 Cominella quoyana accuminata (Hutton, 1893): synonym of Cominella accuminata Hutton, 1893
 Cominella quoyana griseicalx (Willian, 1978): synonym of Cominella griseicalx Willan, 1978
 Cominella quoyana necopinata (Finlay, 1930): synonym of Cominella necopinata (Finlay, 1930)

References

 Hutton, F. W. (1873). Catalogue of the marine Mollusca of New Zealand with diagnoses of the species. Didsbury, Wellington. xx + 116 pp.
 Kobelt, W. (1878). Catalog der Gattung Cominella Gray. Jahrbucher der Deutschen Malakozoologischen Gesellschaft. 5: 231–235.
 Powell A. W. B., New Zealand Mollusca, William Collins Publishers Ltd, Auckland, New Zealand 1979

External links
 Adams A. (1855 ["1854"). Description of twenty-seven new species of shells from the collection of Hugh Cuming, Esq. Proceedings of the Zoological Society of London. 22: 311-317]
 Donald K.M, Winter D.J., Ashcroft A.L. & Spencer H.G. (2015). Phylogeography of the whelk genus Cominella (Gastropoda: Buccinidae) suggests long-distance counter-current dispersal of a direct developer. Biological Journal of the Linnean Society of London. 115: 315-332

Cominellidae
Gastropods of New Zealand
Gastropods described in 1854